Mark Delaney (born 13 July 1964 in Cambridge) is a British whitewater slalom canoeist who competed from the mid-1980s to the early 2000s. He won two medals in the C1 team event at the ICF Canoe Slalom World Championships with a silver in 1993 and a bronze in 1991. He also has a bronze from the same event from the 1998 European Championships in Roudnice nad Labem.

Delaney also competed in two Summer Olympics, earning his best finish of 14th in the C1 event in Atlanta in 1996.

He also won a bronze medal at the 1995 World Cup race in Tacen.

Working for British Canoe Union World Class from Nottingham as a Performance Canoe Coach he's had numerous successes with C2 and C1 paddlers, most significantly as the personal coach to David Florence, Silver Beijing Olympic Games 2008.

World Cup individual podiums

References

1964 births
English male canoeists
Canoeists at the 1992 Summer Olympics
Canoeists at the 1996 Summer Olympics
Living people
Olympic canoeists of Great Britain
Place of birth missing (living people)
Sportspeople from Cambridge
British male canoeists
Medalists at the ICF Canoe Slalom World Championships